The Brave is an American military action drama series which depicted the missions of an elite covert operations team of the Defense Intelligence Agency (DIA), the Defense Clandestine Service. It stars Anne Heche and Mike Vogel, and was created by Dean Georgaris. The series premiered on September 25, 2017, on NBC and was canceled on May 11, 2018 after one season.

Synopsis
The series revolves around the professional and personal sacrifices that the military has to face in war missions in similar to that of
CIA's Special Operations Group. Patricia Campbell (Anne Heche), deputy director of the Defense Intelligence Agency, and her team of analysts have the most advanced surveillance technology in their hand. Captain Adam Dalton (Mike Vogel), a former Delta Force operator, communications director for the team, has the mission of finding an American doctor who was kidnapped and must make the mission safe and sound. Thus, his highly qualified squad must save innocent people's lives and face the most dangerous missions in the world.

Cast and characters

Main
 Anne Heche as deputy director of the Defense Intelligence Agency Patricia Campbell
 Mike Vogel as Captain Adam "Top" Dalton, a former Delta Force operator, communications director for the team
 Tate Ellington as Noah Morgenthau, an analyst at the DIA and former CIA operative
 Demetrius Grosse as CPO Ezekiel "Preach" Carter, a former U.S. Navy SEAL
 Natacha Karam as Sergeant Jasmine "Jaz" Khan, the team's sniper
 Noah Mills as Sergeant Joseph J. "McG" McGuire, the team's combat medic, a former Delta Force operator
 Sofia Pernas as Hannah Rivera, a former operative turned analyst at the DIA
 Hadi Tabbal as Agent Amir Al-Raisani, intelligence director and newest member of the team

Recurring
 Bahram Khosraviani as Qassem Javad

Production
NBC ordered the pilot to series on May 4, 2017 together with Rise, making both series the first regular series orders for the 2017–18 United States network television schedule. In May 2017 NBC announced that Matt Corman and Chris Ord would be the series' showrunners.

In a letter published by the 'Renew The Brave' campaign, guest star Naren Weiss wrote about the series as well as his reasoning for taking on one of the series' antagonist roles, stressing the importance of Hadi Tabbal's portrayal and character (Amir Al-Raisani) in terms of the political and entertainment landscapes of the time. Despite this and several other fan campaigns, the series was not renewed for a second season.

Episodes

Reception

Ratings

Critical response
The review aggregator website Rotten Tomatoes reported a 42% approval rating, with an average rating of 5.75/10 based on 21 reviews. Metacritic, which uses a weighted average, assigned a score of 54 out of 100 based on 11 critics, indicating "mixed or average reviews".

See also

 SEAL Team (TV series)
 Six (TV series)

References

External links

2010s American drama television series
2017 American television series debuts
2018 American television series endings
American action television series
English-language television shows
NBC original programming
American military television series
Television series by Universal Television
Terrorism in television
American thriller television series